Chiara Perini (born 9 December 1997) is an Italian professional racing cyclist, who currently rides for UCI Women's Continental Team .

References

External links
 

1997 births
Living people
Italian female cyclists
Place of birth missing (living people)
People from Magenta, Lombardy
Cyclists from the Metropolitan City of Milan